The Bornean black-capped babbler (Pellorneum capistratoides) is a species of bird in the family Pellorneidae.
It is found on Borneo. This species, the Javan black-capped babbler (P. capistratum) and the Malayan black-capped babbler (P. nigrocapitatum ) were formerly considered conspecific, but were split from it in 2021. Together they were called the black-capped babbler. Its natural habitat is subtropical or tropical moist lowland forest.

References

Bornean black-capped babbler
Birds of Borneo
Bornean black-capped babbler
Bornean black-capped babbler